Petera Te Hiwirori Maynard (c.1893–22 June 1969) was a New Zealand shearer, trade unionist and community leader. Of Māori descent, he identified with the Rongowhakaata iwi. He was born in Manutuke, East Coast, New Zealand on c.1893.

References

1890s births
1969 deaths
New Zealand trade unionists
Rongowhakaata people
New Zealand Māori activists